Dieter Falk (born 5 December 1959 in Klafeld-Geisweid, now Siegen) is a German music producer, keyboardist, Christian composer, and arranger.

Discography
 1985: One Time
 1985: Instrumental Journey
 1987: Today
 1989: Dieter Falk
 1994: Colours
 2006: A Tribute to Paul Gerhardt
 2007: Volkslieder
 2009: Die 10 Gebote ("The Ten Commandments")
 2011: Falk & Sons Celebrate Bach (with his sons)

External links
Official website 

1959 births
German composers
German keyboardists
German music arrangers
German pianists
German record producers
Living people
People from Siegen
Musicians from North Rhine-Westphalia